Gouverneto Monastery ( Μονή Γουβερνέτου) or Our Lady of the Angels  is a Greek Orthodox monastery on the Akrotiri peninsula of the Chania regional unit of Crete, Greece. It is located about 30 kilometres from Chania, and is about 5 kilometres north of the Agia Triada Monastery.

History 
Dated to 1537 (although other sources say 1548), Gouverneto Monastery is reputed to be one of the oldest monasteries in Crete, and a 1637 census, recorded shortly before the Turkish invasion, revealed that at the time there were 60 monks living there,  making it one of the largest in Crete at the time. 

During World War II, the Germans established a guardhouse in the monastery to control the area. Since 2005 it has undergone restoration work by the monks.

Features 
The monastery is a Venetian style fortress with towers at each end, and some Baroque influences added later. It measures roughly 40 metres by 50 metres and contains some 50 monks’ cells on two floors. Its courtyard is rectangular shaped and is dominated by a dome church with an ornate Venetian façade; the church is dedicated to the Virgin. The chapel in the courtyard is reported to have some of the oldest frescoes in Crete.

To the west side of the monastery is the narthex, with chapels dedicated to St. John the Hermit and the Ten Holy Martyrs. There are some notable monsters carved in relief on the front of the church. A cave called Arkouditissa or Arkoudia, is also located in the vicinity. Here the goddess Artemis was once worshiped.

The monastery has strict rules is officially closed on Wednesdays and Fridays.

References

External links

Buildings and structures completed in 1537
16th-century Eastern Orthodox church buildings
Greek Orthodox monasteries in Greece
Buildings and structures in Chania (regional unit)
1537 establishments in the Republic of Venice
Monasteries in Crete